Zhao Dayu (17 January 1961 – 18 March 2015), also known as , was a Chinese coach, businessman and a former international football striker. He was a naturalized citizen of Japan.

As a footballer he played his whole career for Guangzhou F.C., where he was Nicknamed "Dwarf Tiger" because of his short sature, while internationally he was called up to the Chinese national team, where he took part in the 1984 Asian Cup. He had to retire early in 1986 due to injury and moved to Japan to become the coach of Mitsubishi Motors F.C. youth team in 1988. Zhao had  a brief stint at senior management with Guangzhou F.C. before concentrating on football youth development by starting up his own school named Guangzhou Yida in his hometown while outside football he moved into sportswear manufacturing with a company called Ucan.

Playing career
Zhao Dayu studied within the specialist sport schools within Guangzhou before being picked up by Guangzhou F.C., where he showed himself to be a technically gifted player before going on to break into the senior team and soon help guide the club to win promotion to the top tier when the club won the 1981 division title. Zhao's performances for his club soon saw him called up to the Chinese national team, and he soon gained national attention when he scored the winning goal against Argentina in the 1984 Nehru Cup. While the Nehru Cup was a friendly competition Zhao showed what he was capable of when he played in 1984 Asian Cup and helped guide China to a runner-up position within the tournament. It turned out to be the highlight of his career, and in 1986 he had to retire after he was unable to overcome a persistent tibia and fibula fracture in his left leg.   
 
In 1988, Zhao moved to Japan to become the coach of Mitsubishi Motors F.C. youth team and spent several years with his wife and family living in Japan. He switched nationality from China to Japan and changed his name as Tatsuyu Matsuki (松木達裕) before returning to China in 1998. He then had a brief stint with senior management when he returned to Guangzhou F.C. in 1999 as their head coach; however, it has been in youth development where Zhao has concentrated on when he formed a football school named Guangzhou Yida in his hometown of Guangzhou. He is also the owner of a sportswear company named Ucan which had secured a kit sponsorship deal with China League One club Guangdong Sunray Cave.

On 18 March 2015, Zhao died of liver cancer at Sun Yat-sen University Cancer Center in Guangzhou, aged 54.

Career statistics

International statistics

References

External links
Player profile at sodasoccer.com
Team China Stats

1961 births
2015 deaths
Chinese footballers
Footballers from Guangzhou
Chinese football managers
Chinese expatriate footballers
China international footballers
Chinese expatriate sportspeople in Japan
Guangzhou F.C. players
Businesspeople from Guangzhou
Association football forwards
Expatriate footballers in Japan
1984 AFC Asian Cup players
Guangzhou F.C. managers
Deaths from liver cancer
Deaths from cancer in the People's Republic of China
Naturalized citizens of Japan